Wansapanataym (Filipinization of the English phrase "once upon a time") was a Philippine fantasy anthology television series produced and broadcast by ABS-CBN. It airs every Sunday night. The series was aired from June 22, 1997, to February 27, 2005, replacing The Sharon Cuneta Show, then re-aired from 2006 to 2007 and from September 11, 2010, to April 14, 2019, replacing Agimat: Ang Mga Alamat ni Ramon Revilla and was replaced by Hiwaga ng Kambat, the series was aired on ABS-CBN's Yes Weekend! primetime block with new episodes and remakes of past episodes. However, because of the COVID-19 pandemic in the Philippines, Wansapanataym returned on air every weekend until some time in 2020, temporarily replacing 24/7 and Home Sweetie Home until the broadcast franchise of ABS-CBN expired.

History

Wansapanataym was launched in 1997, having genre similarities with the ABS-CBN Foundation-produced education program Hiraya Manawari (which features Filipino short stories for children) and the 1980s series Pinoy Fantasy. A film was also produced based on the show's genre, which starred Shaina Magdayao, Serena Dalrymple and Christopher de Leon.

Judy Ann Santos and the late Rico Yan graced the very first episode of Wansapanataym. From September 2004 to February 2005, the show underwent a reformat featuring two child characters (played by Sharlene San Pedro and Nash Aguas) and a magical book inside a chest or somewhere in their house at the start and end of an episode.

This show is currently streaming on Jeepney TV YouTube Channel every 6:00 pm (formerly 4:00 pm).

Also past episodes (2003-2005; 2010-2013) is currently streaming on Yey! YouTube Channel every Tuesday, 10 am.

1999 film

The movie adaptation of only one episode was made in 1999. The story is about an orphan named Anna (Shaina Magdayao) who searched for her long-lost father (Christopher de Leon). With the help of the guardian angel Barbiel (Serena Dalrymple), Anna was able to see her father for a moment.

Cast and characters
Shaina Magdayao as Anna
Christopher de Leon as Gary Asuring
Angel Aquino as Sylvia Enrique
Serena Dalrymple as Barbiel
Rosemarie Gil as Doña Tisay Enrique
Romeo Rivera as Don Victor Enrique
Jericho Rosales as Michael
Gloria Sevilla as Manang Bising

2010 revival

During the ABS-CBN Trade Launch In 2010, it was announced that Wansapanataym would return with new episodes. Unlike previous revivals, this one focuses on adaptations based on "komiks" in the first season. It premiered on September 11, 2010, with its first episode "Inday Bote" starring Melai Cantiveros-Francisco. The succeeding seasons stayed faithful to the original format. The revival version initially aired on Saturday nights, but since 2014, Wansapanataym returned to Sunday nights again and onwards, similar to the original version.

On June 29, 2013, Wansapanataym was reformatted as a bi-monthly fantasy anthology wherein one story will be shown for a month or two except on Christmas specials.

After almost 9 years of broadcast airing, Wansapanataym ended its run with a replay of Selfie Pa More, Sasha No More on April 14, 2019.

WansapanaSummer
WansapanaSummer is a re-run of the past episodes from the revival version. It was aired every weekday mornings on the network's Umaganda morning block from 2013 to 2014 (its 2015 airing was just a replay of one monthly special).

The first run of WansapanaSummer began airing on April 29, 2013, every Mondays to Fridays at 10:15 AM, replacing Ohlala Couple. The highest rating was 18.3% on May 10, 2013. It ended on June 20, 2013.

In 2014, the series aired again on weekday mornings at 10:15 AM from March 17 to April 11, 2014, replacing Crazy Love.

In 2015, a re-run of My App #Boyfie was abruptly aired at 9:15 AM from April 13 to 24, 2015, replacing Haikyu!! which had only aired five episodes.

Wansapanataym Classics
Wansapanataym Classics is a re-run of past episodes from the old, original version. It was aired on Jeepney TV and Yey! channel.

Theme song
The first theme song was sung by Michelle Ayalde and in the TV series and Roselle Nava in the movie. It was composed by Homer Flores, with lyrics by Jose Bartolome. The song was used from 1997 until 2004.

The second theme song was sung by Nyoy Volante, replacing Ayalde's version. It was composed by Jonathan Manalo replaced Flores, with lyrics by Aries Pollisco, replacing Bartolome. It was used in 2004-2005 and in 2010-2019.

Awards and recognitions

Revival series

See also
List of programs broadcast by ABS-CBN
GMA Telesine Specials

References

External links

Wansapanataym

1997 Philippine television series debuts
2005 Philippine television series endings
1999 films
2010 Philippine television series debuts
2019 Philippine television series endings
1990s Philippine television series
ABS-CBN original programming
Filipino-language television shows
Films about angels
Philippine anthology television series
Star Cinema films
Television series by Dreamscape Entertainment Television
Television series revived after cancellation